The Moto Guzzi 500 TriAlce is a three-wheeler Italian built by Moto Guzzi between 1940 and 1943 for the armed forces.

History
The Moto Guzzi Alce was born in 1939 to replace the Moto Guzzi GT 20, in turn derived in 1938 by Moto Guzzi GT 17 . Acquired also the Militia of the Road and the Police of Italian Africa, was extensively used by the Royal Army during Second World War on all fronts in three versions Monoposto (single-place), Biposto (two-place) and Attrezzata (sidecar combination).

Built in 1940, the TriAlce was a three-wheeler (or "motocarrello") military variant basing on mechanical components of the Alce, produced between 1940 and 1943 in 1741 copies. Along with the Benelli 500 M36 Mototriciclo, belonged to the category of "unified Tricar 500"; Indeed, the DM of August 9, 1941 required the standardization of "motorcycles, sidecars and motofurgoncini" to precise parameters, with a view to their seizure in case of war.

It was used in many different uses: personal transport, radio, support for machine guns 8 mm and guns 20/65 . Particularly important was his role in the motorization of riflemen regiments, such as the 3rd and the 6th Regiment riflemen of the Division "Celere" "Prince Amedeo Duca d'Aosta" , used in Russia .

The TriAlce was the only means of motorized infantry division air-transportable 80th "La Spezia" . In this unit in particular was assigned, in 406 specimens, a removable version, for easy transport aircraft; of these, 79 specimens were assigned 80th Artillery Regiment of the division, for towing cannons 47/32, replaced after sending in Tunisia with 65/17 .

Overview
The TriAlce took the front frame, the fork and the engine FTAA. The engine, a single cylinder four-stroke 498.4 cm³ with horizontal cylinder cast iron and fly outside, air-cooled and disbursing 13.2 hp at 4000 rev / min. The power, in the fall, is guaranteed by the carburetor Dell'Orto MC 26 F. The transmission is the primary helical gear, the secondary roller chain, with gearbox 4-speed and multi-plate clutch in oil bath.

The rear part of the frame was modified with the installation of a frame with suspended axle on leaf springs and chain drive on the center differential. The frame supported a wooden box of 500 kg capacity size 1300 × 960 × 350 mm. The bike is long 2825 mm high and 1050. The track width is 1120 mm and the pitch is 1880 mm. The dry weight is 336 kg . The tank holds 13.5 gallons of gasoline, with a range of 230 km. Reaches a top speed of 73.5 km / h .

See also
 Moto Guzzi Alce
 Moto Guzzi Mulo
 Mototriciclo Guzzi 32
 Moto Guzzi Triporteurs
 List of motorized trikes

References

 Nicola Pignato and Philip Chaplain, Vehicles tactical and logistic of the Italian Royal Army until 1943, the Army - Historical Office, Rome 2005.
 Giulio Benussi, Semincingolati, motor vehicles and special vehicles of the Royal Italian Army 1919/1943, Intergest, 1976.

Trialce
World War II vehicles of Italy